Nolan E. Karras (born December 30, 1944 in Ogden, Utah) is an American politician and businessman who served as a member of the Utah House of Representatives from 1981 to 1990.

Early life and education 
Karras earned a Bachelor of Science degree in Banking and Finance from Weber State College and MBA from the University of Utah in 1970.

Career 
Karras has been a member of the board of trustees of Weber State University since 2013 and chair since 2015. He served as a member of the Utah House of Representatives from 1981 to 1990, representing Roy, Utah. He held the office of Speaker of the House from 1989 to 1990. After leaving office, Karras was succeeded as Speaker by Craig Moody. Karras later served as a member of the Utah State Board of Regents for 12 years. He served as chairman from 2001 to 2005.

Karras ran for Governor of Utah in the 2004 Utah gubernatorial election, coming in second after diplomat Jon Huntsman Jr. in the Republican primary election. Karras had selected former Congresswoman Enid Greene Mickelsen as his running mate.

Karras was a member of the Board of Directors of Scottish Power, a corporation that operates as PacifiCorp in the United States.

Personal life 
Karras is a member of the Church of Jesus Christ of Latter-day Saints. He and his wife, Lynda Karras, have three children and 13 grandchildren. Leah Karras, Sophie Karras, Caden Karras, Griffin Karras, Shelby Sanders, Sam Sanders, Whitney Coburn, Josh sanders, Mitch Sanders, Brady Karras, Carter Karras, Hannah Karras, Christian Karras.

References

External links 
 Biography on the Scottish Power Website

1944 births
Living people
Speakers of the Utah House of Representatives
Republican Party members of the Utah House of Representatives
Politicians from Ogden, Utah
Latter Day Saints from Utah
Weber State University alumni
University of Utah alumni